Michael Self (born November 1, 1990) is an American professional stock car racing driver. He last competed full-time in the ARCA Menards Series, driving the No. 25 Toyota Camry for Venturini Motorsports. He was a former development driver for Richard Childress Racing, and has made seven NASCAR Xfinity Series starts for JD Motorsports. He has eight wins in the NASCAR K&N Pro Series West, and nine wins in ARCA competition.

Racing career

Early years
Self started racing at age eleven in go-karts. Self was a Rotax Max driver and won a regional championship and finished well enough in the national championship to represent America in the world championships. He switched to open-wheel cars five years later and came to stock cars at age eighteen, debuting in late models. The stock car opportunity came around the time of the CART-IndyCar split; Self had scholarship money from Mazda waiting but passed on the opportunity. Throughout his early developmental career, Self's family funded his efforts; the family ran out of money around 2013.

K&N Pro Series West
In 2009, Self ran two races with Motorway Motorsports, starting and parking. After going full-time with Motorway in 2010, Self was signed by the Golden Gate Racing Team, a team owned by Jim Offenbach which was an affiliate of Richard Childress Racing, for the final two races of the season.

The partnership with GGRT extended into 2011, with Self driving top-tier equipment. However, there were missteps, like a crash in Sonoma qualifying that relegated him to the back of the field. With a car that his crew chief described as "winning", Self worked his way through the field using his car and crashed again, finishing 25th. He finished seventh in points with three top fives. The following year, Self broke out, winning three races and only finishing out of the top ten six times in a fifteen race season. He improved to sixth in points. In 2013, Self won three races in a row and never fell out of the top six in points to finish fourth. Despite the six wins, Self did not return to the RCR driver development lineup in 2014.

In 2017, Self returned to the West Series for a part-time schedule of races with Sunrise Ford Racing. He was contacted by team owner Bob Bruncati about running the car, and initially refused on a basis of a lack of sponsorship. Once Bruncati made it known that no sponsorship was needed, Self agreed to drive it for the rest of the season. He won the race at Meridian Speedway after Chris Eggleston was disqualified for jumping the final restart. He finished in the top ten in all of his starts and won another race, at All American Speedway.

ARCA Menards Series
With no ride in the K&N Pro Series West, Self joined Venturini Motorsports for two ARCA Racing Series events in 2014, the first at Mobile International Speedway. He failed to finish either of his starts due to mechanical issues. Again without a ride in any national series, Self partnered with Ranier Racing with MDM for a race at Kansas Speedway in 2016, in which he finished third. He spotted for Justin Haley in 2015 and 2016 at various races.

In January 2017, Self announced that he would return to the No. 28 for the renamed MDM Motorsports (due to Ranier leaving the team as a co-owner) for the season-opening race at Daytona. After running inside the top ten at Daytona, Sinclair Oil Corporation added more races with Self in both the ARCA series and K&N Series with MDM and Mason Mitchell Motorsports on the ARCA side and Sunrise Ford Racing on the NASCAR side. Self finished inside the top five in three of his next four races before he won the season finale at Kansas Speedway, beating out Ty Majeski in a five-wide race after the final restart. Self gave the credit to his spotter Derek Kneeland, who also was the spotter for NASCAR Cup Series driver Kyle Larson at the time.

On January 8, 2018, it was announced that Self and Sinclair partnered with Venturini Motorsports for half of the 2018 ARCA Racing Series schedule. The schedule includes races at Daytona, Nashville, Talladega, Charlotte, Michigan, Chicagoland, Lucas Oil Raceway, Salem and Kansas. Both driver and sponsor had previous experience with Venturini, as Self had raced with the team in ARCA and the Venturini family had operated Sinclair gas stations.

Self began the 2018 ARCA season by winning the season-opening Lucas Oil 200 at Daytona. He followed up with a win at Chicagoland in late June, avenging a near-loss in the 2017 edition of the event. Self beat Riley Herbst and Sheldon Creed on the final restart to secure the victory. At Salem Speedway in fall, Self and Zane Smith got in a racing incident early in the race, leading Smith to retaliate by intentionally destroying Self's car later in the race. Smith was later penalized by ARCA for the incident.

On January 11, 2019, Self and Venturini announced a full schedule for the 2019 ARCA Menards Series season in the team's No. 25 entry. He won the series' first trip to Five Flags Speedway since 1996 in March, outlasting Kaden Honeycutt and Ty Gibbs during the final green-flag run. He followed that up with a win in the season's third race at Salem Speedway after rain arrived after 101 of 200 laps, ultimately handing him the win. At Charlotte Motor Speedway in May, Self won the pole, led the most laps and at one point had over a 10-second advantage over the field, but slapped the wall in the closing portion of the race and faded to fifth. He continued his tear in the front half of the season by leading 85 or 100 laps and winning at Michigan International Speedway in June, but was penalized after the race, keeping his points lead small. At the Allen Crowe 100, Self claimed his first dirt triumph, beating Venturini teammate Christian Eckes on a late restart. Late-season mechanical failures and a lack of restart speed in the season finale at Kansas Speedway, dropping Self to second in the season-long points tally behind Eckes.

After originally only securing enough funding for a partial season, Self returned full-time to Venturini Motorsports in 2020. He began the season by winning the Lucas Oil 200 at Daytona. Self won his second race of the season at the General Tire 100, the series' inaugural race on the road course layout at Daytona. He finished second in the championship to Bret Holmes.

Xfinity Series
Self made his first Xfinity Series start in 2015, replacing Landon Cassill at Iowa Speedway in JD Motorsports' No. 01 entry. In doing so, Self became the first driver from Utah to compete in a NASCAR national series. After crashing in his first start, Self ran six other races for JD, culminating in an eleventh-place finish at Road America driving the No. 4.

Personal life
Self attended the University of Utah. He later attended Central Piedmont Community College, UNC Charlotte and UNC Greensboro. When he is not racing, he is a road racing coach and has worked with Chip Ganassi Racing. Self moved from Utah to California at the genesis of his K&N career and then later to North Carolina around 2014. Self and his wife Dana married in 2017.

Images

Motorsports career results

NASCAR
(key) (Bold – Pole position awarded by qualifying time. Italics – Pole position earned by points standings or practice time. * – Most laps led.)

Xfinity Series

K&N Pro Series West

ARCA Menards Series
(key) (Bold – Pole position awarded by qualifying time. Italics – Pole position earned by points standings or practice time. * – Most laps led.)

ARCA Menards Series East

 Season still in progress 
 Ineligible for series points

References

External links

 

1990 births
ARCA Menards Series drivers
NASCAR drivers
Living people
Racing drivers from Utah
People from Park City, Utah
University of Utah alumni
University of North Carolina at Charlotte alumni
University of North Carolina at Greensboro alumni